Ismail Abdel Salam Ahmed Haniyeh (born 29 January 1962) is a senior political leader of Hamas and formerly one of two disputed Prime Ministers of the Palestinian National Authority. Haniyeh became prime minister after Hamas won the Palestinian legislative elections of 2006. President Mahmoud Abbas dismissed Haniyeh from office on 14 June 2007 at the height of the Fatah–Hamas conflict, but Haniyeh did not acknowledge the decree and continued to exercise prime ministerial authority in the Gaza Strip. In September 2016, reports indicated Haniyeh would replace Khaled Mashal as Chief of Hamas's Political Bureau. He was elected as Hamas political chief on 6 May 2017.

Early life and education 
Haniyeh was born in the Al-Shati refugee camp in the Egyptian-occupied Gaza Strip. His parents became refugees, after they fled their homes near what is now Ashkelon, Israel during the 1948 Arab-Israeli War. He attended United Nations-run schools and graduated from the Islamic University of Gaza with a degree in Arabic literature in 1987. While at university, he had become involved with Hamas. From 1985 to 1986, he was head of the students' council representing the Muslim Brotherhood. He also played as a midfielder in the Islamic Association football team. He graduated at about the same time the First Intifada against the Israeli occupation started in the Gaza Strip.

In prison and deporting 
He participated in protests in First Intifada and was given a short prison sentence by Israeli occupation authorities. He was detained by Israel again in 1988 and imprisoned for six months. In 1989, he was imprisoned for three years.

Following his release in 1992, Israeli occupation authorities deported him to Lebanon with senior Hamas leaders Abdel-Aziz al-Rantissi, Mahmoud Zahhar, Aziz Duwaik, and 400 other activists. The activists stayed at Marj al-Zahour in southern Lebanon for over a year, where according to BBC News, Hamas "received unprecedented media exposure and became known throughout the world". A year later, he returned to Gaza and was appointed as dean of the Islamic University.

Positions in Hamas 
After Israel released Ahmed Yassin from prison in 1997, Haniyeh was appointed to head his office. His prominence within Hamas grew due to his relationship with Yassin and he was appointed as the representative to the Palestinian Authority. His position within Hamas continued to strengthen during the Second Intifada due to his relationship with Yassin, and because of the assassinations of much of the Hamas leadership by the Israeli security forces. He was targeted by the Israel Defense Forces for his alleged involvement in attacks against Israeli citizens. Following a suicide bombing in Jerusalem in 2003, he was slightly injured on his hand by an Israeli Air Force bomb attack attempting to eliminate the Hamas leadership.  In December 2005, Haniyeh was elected to head the Hamas list, which won the Legislative Council elections the following month. Haniyeh succeeded Khaled Meshaal's head leadership of Hamas in elections held in 2016.

Prime minister 

Haniyeh was nominated as prime minister on 16 February 2006 following the Hamas "List of Change and Reform" victory on 25 January 2006. He was formally presented to Mahmoud Abbas on 20 February and was sworn in on 29 March 2006.

Western reaction 
Israel implemented a series of punitive measures, including economic sanctions, against the Palestinian Authority following the election. Acting Prime Minister Ehud Olmert, announced that Israel would not transfer to the Palestinian Authority an estimated $50 million per month in tax receipts that were collected by Israel on behalf of the Palestinian Authority. Haniyeh dismissed the sanctions, stating that Hamas would neither disarm nor would it recognize Israel.

Haniyeh expressed regret that Hamas was subjected to punitive measures, adding that "it [Israel] should have responded differently to the democracy expressed by the Palestinian people".

The United States demanded that $50 million in unexpended foreign aid funds for the Palestinian Authority be returned to the United States, which Palestinian Economic Minister Mazen Sonokrot agreed to do. On the loss of foreign aid from the United States and the European Union, Haniyeh commented that: "The West is always using its donations to apply pressure on the Palestinian people."

Several months after Hamas' 2006 election victory, Haniyeh sent a letter to US President Bush, in which he called on the "American government to have direct negotiations with the elected government", offered a long-term truce with Israel, while accepting a Palestinian state within the 1967 borders and urged an end the international boycott, claiming that it would "encourage violence and chaos". The U.S. government did not respond and maintained its boycott.

Disputed dismissal 
On 14 June 2007, Abbas dismissed Haniyeh and appointed Salam Fayyad in his place. This followed action by Hamas armed forces to take control of Palestinian Authority positions that were under the control of Fatah militias armed and supported by the United States and Israel. The appointment of Fayyad to replace Haniyeh has been challenged as illegal, because under the Palestinian Basic Law, the President of the Palestinian Authority may dismiss a sitting prime minister, but may not appoint a replacement without the approval of the Palestinian Legislative Council. According to the law, until a new prime minister is thus appointed, the outgoing prime minister heads a caretaker government. Fayyad's appointment was never placed before, or approved, by the Legislative Council. For this reason, Haniyeh has continued to operate in Gaza, and has been recognized by a large number of Palestinians as the legitimate acting prime minister. Anis al-Qasem, the Palestinian constitutional lawyer who drafted the Basic Law, is among those who publicly declared the appointment of Fayyad to be illegal.

Dispute with Abbas 

An agreement with Abbas was to have been reached to stop Abbas's call for new elections. On 20 October 2006, on the eve of this deal to end factional fighting between Fatah and Hamas, Haniyeh's convoy came under gunfire in Gaza and one of the cars was set on fire. Haniyeh was not hurt in the attack. Hamas sources said that this was not an assassination attempt. Palestinian Authority security sources reported that the attackers were the relatives of a Fatah man killed by clashes with Hamas.

Denied reentry to Gaza 
During the simmering Fatah–Hamas conflict, on 14 December 2006, Haniyeh was denied entry to Gaza from Egypt at the Rafah Border Crossing. The Border Crossing was closed by order of Israeli Minister of Defence, Amir Peretz. Haniyeh was returning to Gaza from his first official trip abroad as prime minister. He was carrying an estimated 30 million USD in cash, intended for Palestinian Authority payments. Israeli authorities later stated that they would allow Haniyeh to cross the border provided he leave the money in Egypt, which would reportedly be transferred to an Arab League bank account. A gun battle between Hamas militants and the Palestinian Presidential Guard was reported at the Rafah border crossing in response to the incident. The EU monitors who operated the crossing were reportedly evacuated safely. When Haniyeh later attempted to cross the border, an exchange of gunfire left one bodyguard dead and Haniyeh's eldest son wounded. Hamas denounced the incident as an attempt by rival Fatah on Haniyeh's life, prompting firefights in the West Bank and Gaza Strip between Hamas and Fatah forces. Haniyeh was quoted as saying that he knew who the alleged perpetrators were, but declined to identify them and appealed for Palestinian unity. Egypt has since offered to mediate the situation.

Attempt to form unity government 
He resigned on 15 February 2007 as part of the process to allow a unity government between Hamas and Fatah. He formed a new government on 18 March 2007 as head of a new cabinet that included Fatah as well as Hamas politicians.

On 14 June 2007, Palestinian President Mahmoud Abbas announced the dissolution of the March 2007 unity government and the declaration of a state of emergency. Haniya was dismissed and Abbas ruled Gaza and the West Bank by presidential decree.

Hamas requested return of Haniyeh's government to Gaza 
On 13 October 2016, the Legal Committee of the Palestinian Legislative Council (PLC) endorsed a request for the return of Haniyeh's government to the Gaza Strip, following its resignation on 2 June 2014. The endorsement was made in response to PLC's review of a study submitted by members of Hamas' parliament, angry about perceived government failings following Haniyeh's resignation. In Hamas' own words, denouncing the consensus government's "reneging on the internal accord between Hamas and factions of the Palestine Liberation Organization to form the 2014 consensus government, and replacing a number of ministers with Fatah leaders – turning it into a Fatah government." Despite the PLC recommendation and Hamas' plea, both the consensus government and Fatah refused the request, citing in a press release its illegality and risk of further divisions between Hamas-controlled Gaza and the West Bank.

Head of Hamas political bureau 
As of November 2016, reports circulated regarding Haniyeh's succession of Khaled Meshaal as head leader of Hamas. Meshaal, Haniyeh and Palestinian President Mahmoud Abbas met in Qatar recently to discuss national reconciliation and the upcoming national elections. This meeting signaled that Haniyeh had been selected over the other two likely candidates, senior Hamas member Moussa Mohammed Abu Marzook and prestigious Hamas leader Mahmoud Zahhar.

Haniyeh left Gaza in September to visit a series of Arab and Muslim states in preparation for his new role, and officially relocated to the Qatari capital of Doha, where Meshaal has been residing. It is expected of the head of Hamas' politburo to live outside of the Gaza Strip.

In August 2020, Haniyeh called Mahmoud Abbas and rejected the peace agreement between Israel and the United Arab Emirates, something which Reuters called a "rare show of unity".

Meeting with Erdoğan 
In February 2020, Haniyeh met with Turkish President Recep Tayyip Erdoğan. U.S. State Department stated: "President Erdogan’s continued outreach to this terrorist organization only serves to isolate Turkey from the international community, harms the interests of the Palestinian people, and undercuts global efforts to prevent terrorist attacks launched from Gaza."

Views

Pope Benedict XVI Islam controversy 
During the Pope Benedict XVI Islam controversy in 2006, Haniyeh strongly objected to the Pope's remarks: "In the name of the Palestinian people, we condemn the Pope’s remarks on Islam. These remarks go against the truth and touch the heart of our faith." He also denounced the Palestinian attacks on churches in the West Bank and Gaza.

Views on peace with Israel 
In August 2006, on his first visit abroad as prime minister to Iran, Haniyeh said: "We will never recognize the usurper Zionist government and will continue our jihad-like movement until the liberation of Jerusalem". In December 2010, Haniyeh stated at a news conference in Gaza, "We accept a Palestinian state on the borders of 1967, with Jerusalem as its capital, the release of Palestinian prisoners, and the resolution of the issue of refugees." In addition, he said that if the Palestinian electorate approves such a peace agreement with Israel, his government will abide by it notwithstanding previous Hamas positions on the issue.

In a speech broadcast on Al-Aqsa TV on 23 March 2014 (the tenth anniversary of the assassination of Sheik Ahmad Yassin), Haniyeh stated (as translated by MEMRI): "Out of deprivation, we shall establish the balance of terror. Out of the ruins, we shall rock Tel Aviv. [With] our bare hands, we shall dig into the rock and do the impossible." The crowd immediately responded (as translated by Al-Monitor), "Move forward Hamas, move! We are the cannon and you are the bullets. … Oh Qassam, our beloved, bombard Tel Aviv."

Views on Osama bin Laden 
On 2 May 2011, Haniyeh condemned the killing by American forces of Osama bin Laden, founder and leader of Al-Qaeda, stating that the operation is "the continuation of the American oppression and shedding of blood of Muslims and Arabs". He stated, "We condemn the assassination and the killing of an Arab holy warrior." Political analysts said the remarks were an attempt to cool differences in the Gaza Strip with al Qaeda-inspired Salafi groups, which condemn Hamas as too moderate. The United States government condemned his remarks as "outrageous".

Personal and family life 

Haniyeh is married and has 13 children. In 2009, the family lived in Al-Shati refugee camp in the northern Gaza Strip. In 2010, Haniyeh purchased a  parcel of land in Rimal, a Gaza City beachfront neighborhood. Haniyeh registered the land in the name of his son-in-law. Subsequently, Haniyeh reportedly purchased additional homes and registered them under the names of his children. According to a 2014 Ynet article, Haniyeh is a millionaire, stemming from the 20% tax charged on all items entering though tunnels from Egypt to the Gaza Strip. Haniyeh's eldest son was arrested by Egyptian authorities at the Rafah Border Crossing with a few million dollars, which he intended to take into Gaza.

Haniyeh's sisters Kholidia, Laila and Sabah, are Israeli citizens and live in the Bedouin town of Tel as-Sabi in southern Israel. Kholodia moved to Tel as-Sabi first and then her two sisters followed. Kholidia's husband said "Our life is normal here and we want it to continue." Laila and Sabah are both widowed but remain in Tel as-Sabi assumingly to retain their Israeli citizenship. Some of the children of the three sisters have served in the Israel Defense Forces.

In early 2012, Israeli authorities granted a request to travel by Haniyeh's sister, Suhila Abd el‑Salam Ahmed Haniyeh, and her critically ill husband for emergency heart treatment that could not be treated by hospitals in Gaza. After successful treatment at the Rabin Medical Center in Petah Tikva, Israel, the couple returned to Gaza. Haniyeh's granddaughter was treated in an Israeli hospital in November 2013 and his mother-in-law was treated in an Israeli hospital in June 2014. In October 2014, a few months after the 2014 Israel–Gaza War, Haniyeh's daughter spent a week in an Israeli hospital in Tel Aviv for emergency treatment after she suffered complications from a routine procedure.

In September 2016, Haniyeh left Gaza with his wife and two of his sons for the annual pilgrimage to Mecca, known as the Hajj. This trip, interpreted as a campaign commencement, bolstered reports that Haniyeh was to replace Meshaal. He went to Qassim Suleimani's funeral, in Tehran, Iran in 2020.

Notes

References

External links 

 
 
 
 

1963 births
Living people
Islamic University of Gaza alumni
People from Gaza Governorate
Palestinian Sunni Muslims
Hamas members
Prime Ministers of the Palestinian National Authority
Members of the 2006 Palestinian Legislative Council
Palestinian refugees
Palestinian nationalists
Palestinian politicians